Sinivuori Strict Nature Reserve (Sinivuoren luonnonpuisto) is a strict nature reserve located in the Pirkanmaa region of Finland. There are no paths in this reserve of deciduous forest, though walking on the crossing roads is allowed. Most of the forests of this type in Finland have been logged down, when fields were created.

External links
 2019 finland in figures - Tilastokeskus

Strict nature reserves of Finland
Geography of Pirkanmaa
Orivesi